Agorioides is a small genus of Melanesian jumping spiders. It was first described by Wayne Maddison and T. Szűts in 2019, and it has only been found in Papua New Guinea. It is placed in the tribe Myrmarachnini, part of the Salticoida clade of the subfamily Salticinae in Wayne Maddison's 2015 classification of the jumping spiders.  it contains only two species: A. cherubino and A. papagena.

See also
 List of Salticidae genera

References

Salticidae genera
Arthropods of New Guinea